Vera Brühne (February 6, 1910 in Essen – April 17, 2001 in Munich) became famous throughout Germany as a victim of miscarriage of justice. In 1961/62, she was convicted, together with Johann Ferbach, of having murdered the physician Otto Praun and his lover. Ulrich Sonnemann considered the case as a new Dreyfus affair. In 1979, she was pardoned by Bavarian governor Franz Josef Strauss.

Dramatization
 Vera Brühne (2001), film

References

External links 
 Vera Brühne on IMDb
 
 Lebenslänglich für Vera Brühne. Deutsche Welle.
 Der Tod kam nicht um 19.45 Uhr. In: Der Spiegel, 1973, n. 39. 
 Die wahrhaftige Lügnerin. In: Die Zeit, n. 22/2001.
 Film Documentation „Die großen Kriminalfälle: Lebenslänglich für Vera Brühne“, by Michael Gramberg, WDR, May 11, 2000.

1910 births
2001 deaths
German people convicted of murder
People convicted of murder by Germany